"God Bless America" is an American patriotic song written by Irving Berlin during World War I in 1918 and revised by him in the run up to World War II in 1938. The later version was notably recorded by Kate Smith, becoming her signature song.

"God Bless America" takes the form of a prayer (with introductory lyrics noting that "as we raise our voices, in a solemn prayer") for God's blessing and peace for the nation ("...stand beside her and guide her through the night...").

History
Irving Berlin wrote the song while serving in the U.S. Army at Camp Upton in Yaphank, New York at the end of World War I, but decided that it did not fit in a revue called Yip Yip Yaphank, so he set it aside. The lyrics at that time included the line "Make her victorious on land and foam, God bless America..." as well as "Stand beside her and guide her to the right with the light from above".

Music critic Jody Rosen says that a 1906 Jewish dialect novelty song, "When Mose with His Nose Leads the Band," contains a six-note fragment that is "instantly recognizable as the opening strains of 'God Bless America'". He interprets this as an example of Berlin's "habit of interpolating bits of half-remembered songs into his own numbers." Berlin, born Israel Baline, had himself written several Jewish-themed novelty tunes.

In 1938, with the rise of Adolf Hitler, Berlin, who was Jewish and had arrived in the U.S. from Russia at the age of five, felt it was time to revive it as a "peace song", and it was introduced on an Armistice Day broadcast in 1938, sung by Kate Smith on her radio show. This song has become the performer's calling card. Berlin had made some minor changes; by this time, "to the right" might have been considered a call to the political right, so he substituted "through the night" instead. He also provided an introduction that is now rarely heard but which Smith always used: "While the storm clouds gather far across the sea / Let us swear allegiance to a land that's free / Let us all be grateful for a land so fair, / As we raise our voices in a solemn prayer."  (In her first broadcast of the song, Kate Smith sang "that we're far from there" rather than "for a land so fair".)  This was changed when Berlin published the sheet music in March 1939.

Woody Guthrie criticized the song, and in 1940 he wrote "This Land Is Your Land," originally titled "God Blessed America For Me," as a response. Anti-Semitic groups such as the Ku Klux Klan also protested against the song due to its authorship by a Jewish immigrant.

In 1943, Smith's rendition was featured in the patriotic musical film This is the Army along with other Berlin songs. The manuscripts in the Library of Congress reveal the evolution of the song from victory to peace. Berlin gave the royalties of the song to The God Bless America Fund for redistribution to Boy Scouts and Girl Scouts in New York City. Smith performed the song on her two NBC television series in the 1950s. "God Bless America" also spawned another of Irving Berlin's tunes, "Heaven Watch The Philippines," during the end of World War II. The Philippines was an American possession since 1898 and recently liberated from Japanese occupation; Berlin wrote it after he heard Filipinos singing a modified version of the song replacing "America" with "The Philippines."

The song was used early in the Civil Rights Movement as well as at labor rallies. During the 1960s counterculture, the song was increasingly used by Christian conservatives in the US to signal their opposition to secular liberalism and to silence dissenters who were speaking in favor of communism or in opposition to the U.S. involvement in the Vietnam War.

Later, from December 11, 1969, through the early 1970s, the playing of Smith singing the song before many home games of the National Hockey League's Philadelphia Flyers brought it renewed popularity as well as a reputation for being a "good luck charm" to the Flyers long before it became a staple of nationwide sporting events. The Flyers brought Smith in to perform live before Game 6 of the 1974 Stanley Cup Finals on May 19, 1974, and the Flyers won the Cup that day.

Lyrics
While the storm clouds gather far across the sea,
 
Let us swear allegiance to a land that's free.

Let us all be grateful for a land so fair,

As we raise our voices in a solemn prayer.

God bless America, land that I love

Stand beside her and guide her

Through the night with the light from above

From the mountains to the prairies

To the oceans white with foam

God bless America, my home sweet home

God bless America, my home sweet home.

Notable public performances

In 1940 "God Bless America" was the official campaign song for both President Franklin Delano Roosevelt and his Republican opponent, Wendell Willkie. At that time, the song represented cultural and religious tolerance.

Irving Berlin personally performed the song on The Ed Sullivan Show on May 5, 1968, during an episode dedicated to him in honor of his 80th birthday.

During a live television broadcast on the evening of the September 11, 2001, terrorist attacks, following addresses by then House and Senate leaders, Speaker Dennis Hastert (Republican) and Tom Daschle (Democrat), members of the United States Congress broke out into an apparently spontaneous verse of "God Bless America" on the steps of the Capitol building in Washington, D.C.

On July 21, 2011, Smith's version of the song was played as NASA's final wakeup call for Space Shuttle Atlantis (STS-135), capping the 30-year Space Shuttle program.

Sports events

National Hockey League
"God Bless America" has been performed at home games of the National Hockey League's Philadelphia Flyers and those of the Ottawa Senators in which the visiting team is from the United States. (The NHL requires arenas in both the U.S. and Canada to perform both "The Star-Spangled Banner" and "O Canada," the Canadian national anthem, at games that involve teams from both countries.)

At some Flyers' home games, especially during big games and the playoffs, their main anthem singer, Lauren Hart, has sung "God Bless America" alternating lyrics with Kate Smith on a video screen, until 2019. Smith actually appeared in person to sing at select Flyers games, including their 1974 Stanley Cup clinching game against the Boston Bruins, to which she received a thunderous ovation from the passionate Philadelphia fans. Before games whenever "God Bless America" is performed until 2019, Lou Nolan, the PA announcer for the Flyers at the Wells Fargo Center, would say: "Ladies and gentlemen, at this time, we ask that you please rise and remove your hats and salute to our flags and welcome the No. 1 ranked anthemist in the NHL, Our very own Lauren Hart, as she sings (if the visiting team is from Canada, O Canada, followed by) God Bless America, accompanied by the great Kate Smith."

At some Senators home games since , if the visiting team is from the U.S., their main anthem singer, Ontario Provincial Police Constable Lyndon Slewidge, has sung "God Bless America" and "O Canada."  An example of this came during the Senators' home opener during the 2002–03 season, when they were home against the New Jersey Devils.

During Tom Golisano's time as owner of the Buffalo Sabres, the team occasionally substituted "God Bless America" for "The Star-Spangled Banner" during certain special events. When this occurred, Ronan Tynan was brought in to sing the song while usual anthem singer Doug Allen sang "O Canada."

Major League Baseball
At Chicago's Wrigley Field during the Vietnam War, the song was often played by the organist as part of his postgame playlist while fans filed out of the stadium.

Since the September 11, 2001, terrorist attacks, "God Bless America" is commonly sung during the seventh-inning stretch in Major League Baseball games, most often on Sundays, Opening Day, Memorial Day, Independence Day, All-Star Game, Labor Day, September 11, and all post-season Major League Baseball games. Following the attacks, John Dever, then the Assistant Media Relations Director of the San Diego Padres, suggested the song replace "Take Me Out to the Ball Game", the more traditional 7th inning anthem. Major League Baseball quickly followed the Padres lead and instituted it league-wide for the rest of the season. Presently, teams decide individually when to play the song.

The New York Yankees, at Yankee Stadium home games, is currently the only Major League club to play "God Bless America" at every game during the seventh-inning stretch. The Yankees' YES Network televises its performance during all games before going to a commercial. During major games, such as Opening Day, national holidays, playoff contests, or games against the Boston Red Sox or New York Mets, the Yankees will often have Irish tenor Ronan Tynan perform the song.

On August 26, 2008, at a Boston Red Sox game at Yankee Stadium, a fan who had attempted to leave for the restroom during the playing of the song was restrained and subsequently sent out of the building by NYPD officers. Part of the resolution of the resulting lawsuit was that the New York Yankees announced that they would no longer restrict the movement of fans during the playing of the song.

On September 15, 2009, three high school teens filed a lawsuit against New Jersey's minor league Newark Bears for being ejected from Eagles Riverfront Stadium over their refusal to stand during the playing of "God Bless America" on June 29, 2009. Before being ejected, they were asked to leave the stadium by Bears president and co-owner Thomas Cetnar.

American football
At the January 1, 1976, Rose Bowl, to honor the start of the United States Bicentennial, Kate Smith and the UCLA Band performed "God Bless America" for a national television audience.

During the Super Bowl LI halftime show a pre-recorded introduction by Lady Gaga, who headlined the show, featured both "God Bless America" and "This Land is Your Land".

Indianapolis 500
The Indianapolis 500 is traditionally held at the end of May, and "God Bless America" has been sung there since 2003. The song "America the Beautiful" was sung before, but it was switched to "God Bless America" in the post-9/11 era. The song for many years was performed by Florence Henderson, a native Hoosier, and a friend of the Hulman-George family, the track's owners at the time. The performance, often not televised, immediately precedes the national anthem. Henderson routinely sang the entire song, including the prologue, and in some years sang the chorus a second time.

Recorded versions
Bing Crosby recorded the song on March 22, 1939, for Decca Records.

In the 1978 film The Deer Hunter by Michael Cimino, the song is sung at the end.

In 1997, American country music recording artist LeAnn Rimes recorded a cover of the song on her second studio album, You Light Up My Life: Inspirational Songs. After the events of September 11, Rimes rereleased the song on a compilation album by the same name. Rimes also released the song on a CD single. Two versions were released on October 16, 2001. Both versions contain the song as the A-side track, but the B-side tracks were different. One released to the general public was released with the B-side track, "Put a Little Holiday in Your Heart," and the other was released to radio with the B-side track of Rimes's rendition of "The National Anthem." Rimes's version peaked at No. 51 on the Billboard Country Songs chart on October 27, 2001.

The song was recorded by New York City's "singing cop," Daniel Rodríguez, and charted for one week at No. 99 on the Billboard Hot 100 as a single. Before the 2001 versions, the last time "God Bless America" had been a Billboard chart hit was in 1959 when Connie Francis reached No. 36 with her version (the B-side of her Top 10 hit "Among My Souvenirs").

On January 20, 2017, Jackie Evancho released Together We Stand, a disc containing three patriotic songs including "God Bless America". The song charted at No. 5 on Billboard's Classical Digital Song sales chart.

The Violent Femmes recorded "God Bless America" for their 2019 album Hotel Last Resort.

Celine Dion 

On September 21, 2001, following the September 11 attacks, Canadian pop star Celine Dion performed "God Bless America" during the television special America: A Tribute to Heroes. Shortly afterwards on October 16, 2001 Sony Music released a benefit album called God Bless America, which featured Dion singing the song. The album debuted at number one on the Billboard 200 and became the first charity album to reach the top since USA for Africa's We Are the World in 1985. Dion's version also received enough radio airplay to reach number 14 on Billboards Adult Contemporary chart. The music video premiered in September 2001.

Dion performed the song also a few times during 2002. In 2003, she performed it at the Super Bowl XXXVII. She also sang it on July 4, 2004, in her A New Day... show. "God Bless America" performed by Dion exists in two versions, live and studio. Both included on collections to gather funds for the victims of the terrorist attacks of September 11, 2001, and their families. The live version was released on America: A Tribute to Heroes CD and DVD on December 4, 2001. The studio version was released on the God Bless America album. The song was recorded on September 20, 2001, the day before the telethon. It was meant to be a replacement for the performance in the event something happened and Dion could not appear. The song was produced by David Foster.

Weekly charts

Year-end charts

Parodies
The song has spawned numerous parodies.

 An irreverent version of the lyrics was printed in the book The Mad World of William M. Gaines, by Frank Jacobs (1972). Mad magazine's veteran art editor, John Putnam, had prepared some copy and sent it to the printers; the word "America" was divided, with a hyphen, at the end of one line. The copy was returned to Putnam by the typesetting foreman, who explained that his union had a rule forbidding the splitting of that word. Putnam obliged, rewriting the copy and sending it back with this enclosure:

Don't break "America";
Land we extol;
Don't deface it;
Upper-case it;
Keep it clean, keep it pure, keep it whole;
In Bodoni, in Futura,
In Old English, in Cabell [sic]--
Don't break "America"--
Or we'll—raise—hell!

In "Temporarily Humboldt County" on The Firesign Theatre's first album Waiting for the Electrician or Someone Like Him (1968), a group of Native American men briefly and ironically sing "God bless Vespucciland..." to the tune of "God Bless America" as they fade off into the distance. The reference is a play on the name of Italian explorer Amerigo Vespucci, whose first name is the source for the name "America" for the New World.
 In the title track of their 1969 album How Can You Be in Two Places at Once When You're Not Anywhere at All, The Firesign Theatre briefly break into lines based on the song:  "Ask the postman. Ask the mailman. Ask the milkman...white with foam."
 God Bless America, a 2011 film written and directed by Bobcat Goldthwait, is a dark comedy that satirizes the present-day American values. The story revolves around a loveless, jobless, possibly terminally ill man and his 16-year-old female companion, who go on a killing spree against what they consider the stupidest, cruelest, and most repugnant members of American society.

See also 

 "America the Beautiful"

References
Notes

General references
Collins, Ace. Songs Sung, Red, White, and Blue: The Stories Behind America's Best-Loved Patriotic Songs.  HarperResource, 2003, 
Kashkowitz, Sheryl. God Bless America: The Surprising History of an Iconic Song. Oxford Univ. Press, 2013,

External links
Library of Congress page with more information, pictures of manuscript, etc.
 

American patriotic songs
Songs written by Irving Berlin
1918 songs
1939 singles
1959 singles
2001 singles
Connie Francis songs
Kate Smith songs
Celine Dion songs
Grammy Hall of Fame Award recipients
American nationalism
United States National Recording Registry recordings
Columbia Records singles
Epic Records singles
Curb Records singles